The 2020–21 Bradley Braves men's basketball team represented Bradley University during the 2020–21 NCAA Division I men's basketball season. The Braves, led by sixth-year head coach Brian Wardle, play their home games at Carver Arena in Peoria, Illinois as members of the Missouri Valley Conference. In a season limited by the ongoing COVID-19 pandemic, the Braves finished the season 12–16, 6–12 in MVC play to finish in eighth place. They lost to Southern Illinois in the first round of the MVC tournament.

Previous season
The Braves finished the 2019–20 season 23–11, 11–7 in MVC play to finish in a tie for third place. They defeated Southern Illinois, Drake, and Valparaiso to win the MVC tournament for the second consecutive year. As a result, they received the conference's automatic bid to the NCAA tournament. However, the NCAA Tournament was thereafter canceled due to the ongoing COVID-19 pandemic.

Offseason

2020 recruiting class

Roster

Schedule and results

|-
! colspan="9" style=|  Non-conference regular season

|-
!colspan=12 style=| Missouri Valley Conference regular season

|-
!colspan=12 style=| MVC tournament

|-

Source

References

2020-21
2020–21 Missouri Valley Conference men's basketball season
2020 in sports in Illinois
2021 in sports in Illinois